Senator Davenport may refer to:

Ashley Davenport (1794–1874), New York State Senate
Frank Davenport (1912–1995), New Jersey State Senate
Franklin Davenport (1755–1832), New Jersey State Senate
Frederick M. Davenport (1866–1956), New York State Senate
Gail Davenport (born 1949), Georgia State Senate
Ira Davenport (politician) (1841–1904), New York State Senate
John Davenport (Ohio politician) (1788–1855), Ohio State Senate
Stephen Davenport (1924–2011), Massachusetts State Senate
William N. Davenport (1856–1933), Massachusetts State Senate